Seán Brennan (born 18 February 1995) is an Irish hurler who plays for Dublin Senior Championship club Cuala and at inter-county level with the Dublin senior hurling team. He currently lines out as a goalkeeper.

Career

Brennan first came to prominence at club level during a golden age for the Cuala club. He lined out in goal when the club won consecutive All-Ireland Club Championship titles in 2017 and 2018. He has also won two Leinster Club Championship titles and was included on the inaugural Club Team of the Year in 2018. Having never played at minor inter-county level, Brennan first lined out with Dublin as goalkeeper with the under-21 team in 2015. He made his senior debut during the 2019 Walsh Cup.

Career statistics

Honours

Harry Bolands
North American Senior Hurling Championship: 2015

Cuala
All-Ireland Senior Club Hurling Championship: 2017, 2018
Leinster Senior Club Hurling Championship: 2016, 2017
Dublin Senior Hurling Championship: 2015, 2016, 2017, 2019, 2020

References

External link
Seán Brennan profile at the Dublin GAA website

1995 births
Living people
Cuala hurlers
Dublin inter-county hurlers
Hurling goalkeepers